White pizza, pizza bianca or a white pie is a style of pizza that does not use tomato sauce. The pizza generally consists of pizza dough, olive oil, garlic, cheese, salt and sometimes toppings including vegetables such as spinach, tomato, and herbs. Ricotta is a common type of cheese used on white pizza in the United States. Sometimes white sauces such as bechamel are used.

Gallery

See also
 List of pizza varieties by country

References

Italian-American cuisine
Italian-American culture in New York (state)
Italian-American culture in Philadelphia
Italian-American culture in Rhode Island
Pizza styles